Events in the year 1337 in Japan.

Incumbents
Monarch: Kōmyō

Events
January 23 - Emperor Godaigo leaves Kyoto for Yoshino where he sets up the Southern Court, beginning a 60-year era of rival imperial courts in Japan. (Traditional Japanese Date: Twenty-first Day of the Twelfth Month, 1336)

References

 
 
Japan
Years of the 14th century in Japan